Patrick Leafa is a professional rugby union player with the Melbourne Rebels. His preferred position is Hooker. Born and raised  in New Zealand Leafa played club  rugby for Auckland Marist Brothers Old Boys where he captained the side  and represented Auckland in the ITM cup.

He pursued his rugby career by moving to Australia and playing for the Tuggeranong Vikings in the ACT. He earned opportunities to play with the Brumby Runners - the Brumbies development squad.

He was signed by the Melbourne Rebels after a break out season that included winning player of the year for his club, the McDougall Medal for player of the tournament in 2012 and the ACT Griffins player of the year.

Leafa has been contracted by the Melbourne Rebels and offered a place in the Extended Player Squad.

Super Rugby Statistics

References

External links
 Patrick Leafa, Melbourne Rebels EPS profile

1989 births
New Zealand rugby union players
New Zealand sportspeople of Samoan descent
Melbourne Rebels players
Melbourne Rising players
Auckland rugby union players
Rugby union hookers
Living people
Rugby Club Vannes players
New Zealand expatriate rugby union players
Expatriate rugby union players in Australia
Expatriate rugby union players in France
Rugby union players from Auckland